Kaufmann Peaks is a 3,110 and 3,094 metre double summit mountain located on a ridge between the Howse River valley and Mistaya River valley of Banff National Park, in the Canadian Rockies of Alberta, Canada. The nearest higher neighbor is Mount Sarbach,  to the northwest, with Epaulette Mountain immediately to the southeast. Kaufmann Peaks is situated south of Saskatchewan Crossing, where the Icefields Parkway intersects with the David Thompson Highway.

History

The South Peak (3,110 m) is named for Hans Kaufmann (1874–1930), the younger of two Swiss brothers who were popular mountain guides.  Hans Kaufmann completed twelve first ascents in the Rockies during the years 1901 to 1904. The North Peak (3,094 m) honors Christian Kaufmann (1872–1939) who completed 36 first ascents in the Canadian Rockies by making fifteen of those in 1901 and ten more in 1902. The two were half-brothers to Peter Kaufmann. The first ascent of Kaufmann Peaks was made in 1927 by D. Duncan and guide Ernest Feuz. Recommended by James Outram in 1903, the mountain's toponym was officially adopted in 1920 by the Geographical Names Board of Canada.

Geology

Like other mountains in Banff Park, Kaufmann Peaks is composed of sedimentary rock laid down during the Precambrian to Jurassic periods. Formed in shallow seas, this sedimentary rock was pushed east and over the top of younger rock during the Laramide orogeny. A glacier shared with Mount Sarbach resides in the northeast cirque.

Climate

Based on the Köppen climate classification, Kaufmann Peaks is located in a subarctic climate with cold, snowy winters, and mild summers.

See also
List of mountains of Canada

References

External links
 Weather: Kaufmann Peaks
 Parks Canada web site: Banff National Park

Kaufmann Peaks
Kaufmann Peaks
Kaufmann Peaks
Alberta's Rockies